An opinion is a subjective belief, and is the result of emotion or interpretation of facts.

Opinion may also refer to:
Legal opinion, a written explanation by judges that accompanies an order or ruling in a case
Judicial opinion
Opinion journalism
Opinion piece, an article, published in a newspaper or magazine, that mainly reflects the author's opinion about the subject
"Opinion" (song), 2004 song by Kurt Cobain
I'm entitled to my opinion

See also
La Opinión (disambiguation)
Opinions (TV series), a British series